Benjamin Myer Fogle,  (born 3 November 1973) is an English broadcaster, writer and adventurer, best known for his presenting roles with British television channels Channel 5, BBC and ITV.

Early life
Fogle is the son of English actress Julia Foster and Canadian veterinarian Bruce Fogle. He was educated at two independent schools: The Hall School, Hampstead in London, and Bryanston School in Blandford Forum, Dorset.

Fogle went to Ecuador for a gap year, working in an orphanage teaching English. He then took a second year working on a turtle conservation project on the Mosquito Coast of Honduras and Nicaragua.

Fogle studied for a degree in Latin American studies at the University of Portsmouth, before studying for a year at the University of Costa Rica.

Career

Magazines
Fogle's initial jobs included picture editor at Tatler magazine.

Television
Fogle first came to public notice when he participated in the BBC reality show Castaway 2000, which followed a group of thirty-six people marooned on the Scottish island of Taransay for a year, starting 1 January 2000. This was a social experiment aimed at creating a fully self-sufficient community within a year.

Fogle is a television presenter who has worked for the BBC, ITV, Channel 5, Sky, Discovery and the National Geographic channels in the UK. He has hosted Crufts, One Man and His Dog, Countryfile, Country Tracks, Extreme Dreams with Ben Fogle, Animal Park, Wild on the West Coast, Wild in Africa, "Ben Fogle – African Migration" and Ben Fogle's Escape in Time. Fogle made a film about the facial deforming disease noma for a BBC Two documentary Make Me A New Face which followed the work of the charity Facing Africa and Great Ormond Street Hospital.

Fogle has produced films about naval history and the Royal National Lifeboat Institute (RNLI) for the History Channel and followed Princes William and Harry on their first joint Royal Tour in Botswana and made an exclusive documentary called Prince William's Africa. He marked the centenary of Captain Scott's expedition to the South Pole with The Secrets of Scott's Hut. Fogle is popular on the motivational and corporate speaking circuit. His new series, Swimming with Crocodiles will air on BBC Two, Storm City in 3D on Sky One and National Geographic. Fogle has become a special correspondent for NBC News in the United States.

Fogle appeared on the programme Countryfile with John Craven from 2001 to 2008, during which he reported on a number of UK rural pastimes. He rejoined the programme in 2014.

Since 2013, Fogle has presented two series of Harbour Lives, a documentary series on ITV. In 2014, Fogle joined the presenting team on ITV series Countrywise with Liz Bonnin and Paul Heiney, which covers aspects of the British coast and country.

In 2013, Fogle presented a new show for Channel 5 called Ben Fogle: New Lives in the Wild, that saw him follow the stories of people living in the wild and isolated from society. Fogle also took over as the host of Animal Clinic on Channel 5, replacing Rolf Harris.

Sport

Atlantic Rowing Race

Fogle was the first to cross the line in the pairs division of the 2005–2006 Atlantic Rowing Race in "Spirit of EDF Energy", partnered by Olympic rower James Cracknell. While competing in the 3,000-mile race, the pair had their boat fully capsized by huge waves. They made landfall in Antigua at 07.13 GMT on 19 January 2006, a crossing time of 49 days, 19 hours, 8 minutes. After penalties, they were placed second in the pairs and fourth overall. In 2007, the BBC series that followed the pair, Through Hell and High Water, won a Royal Television Society award.

Marathon des Sables
He has also completed the six-day Marathon des Sables for the World Wide Fund for Nature across  of the Sahara Desert and the Safaricom Marathon in Kenya for the Tusk Trust, with Longleat Safari Park keeper Ryan Hockley. Fogle has completed the Bupa Great North Run in 1 hour 33 minutes, the London Marathon and the Royal Parks Half Marathon. He beat EastEnders actor Sid Owen in a three-round charity boxing match for BBC Sport Relief under the training of Frank Bruno and he recently re-ran the Safaricom marathon in Kenya with the injured Battleback Soldiers.

Amundsen Omega 3 South Pole Race
Fogle teamed up with Cracknell once again, together with Ed Coats, a Bristol-based doctor, as Team QinetiQ to take part in the inaugural "Amundsen Omega 3 South Pole Race". Six teams set out to race across the Antarctic Plateau to commemorate the historic race of 1911 between Roald Amundsen and Robert Falcon Scott. Having led the race for much of the time, the team took 18 days, 5 hours and 10 minutes to complete the  race, coming second overall, 20 hours behind the Norwegian team, who commended them on making it "a fantastic race", and over two days ahead of the next placed team. The race was filmed by the BBC for the series On Thin Ice and was aired in Summer 2009. Five episodes of On Thin Ice were broadcast on BBC Two Sunday evenings receiving a peak record of 3.7 million viewers. Macmillan published an account of their journey, Race to The Pole, which became a top-10 best-seller in the UK.

In October 2009, Fogle and Cracknell cycled a rickshaw 423 miles from Edinburgh to London non-stop. They took 60 hours to reach the capital, raising money for SSAFA (Soldiers, Sailors, Airmen and Families Association). The event was filmed as part of The Pride of Britain Awards. Fogle and Cracknell planned to take part in the Tour Divide race in 2010, a 3,000-mile mountain-bike race across the Rocky Mountains, from Banff in Canada to the border of Mexico. The world record is held by American Matthew Lee and stands at 17 days. The race was put on hold after Cracknell received life-threatening injuries after being knocked from his bicycle in America while training.
In 2013, Fogle and Cracknell teamed up again for their third and final expedition across the Empty-quarter of Oman for a new BBC Two series.

Mount Everest
On 16 May 2018, Fogle summited Mount Everest, completing the climb over a six-week period whilst accompanied by two local sherpa guides, as well as Kenton Cool.
His trek also included former Olympic cyclist Victoria Pendleton, who  abandoned her attempt early owing to severe altitude sickness.
A film Our Mount Everest Challenge (The Challenge: Everest) documented by CNN, aired in June 2018, to highlight environmental issues around mountains in his new role as UN patron of the wilderness. The whole project was made possible by Fogle's good friend, Princess Haya Bint Al Hussein of Jordan, in memory of her father alongside raising awareness and money for The Red Cross.

Writing
Fogle has written ten books; The Teatime Islands (2004) in search of the remaining islands in the British Empire in which he travels to Saint Helena, Ascension Island, the Falkland Islands, the British Indian Ocean Territories and Tristan da Cunha. He also tried to visit Pitcairn Island by private yacht, but when the inhabitants learned that he was a journalist they refused to let him land. Fogle claims that they suspected that he was a spy, and after six hours of interrogation he was refused permission to visit and deported. He was also accused of attempting to smuggle a breadfruit on to the island. The book was short-listed for the WHSmith's people's award for Best Travel Book.

He has also written Offshore (2006), published by Penguin Books, in which he travelled around Britain in search of an island of his own. He visited the Principality of Sealand and attempted to land on Rockall in the North Atlantic. In 2006 he published The Crossing, published by Atlantic books and co-written with Cracknell followed their Transatlantic rowing bid. In 2009, The Race to the Pole was published by Macmillan and spent ten weeks in the best-seller list. His seventh book Labrador was released in 2015. In it, he explores the origin, characteristics and exploits of the breed.

In 2016, Land Rover: The Story of the Car that Conquered the World was published. English: A Story of Marmite, Queuing and Weather, which was published in 2017, examines the English national character. He published his tenth book, Up, in October 2018. Co-written with his wife, Marina, Up documents his planning, training and eventual summit of Mount Everest.

In 2019 Fogle launched a children's book series, co-written by best-selling children's author Steve Cole (author) and illustrated by Nikolas Ilic. Inspired by Fogle's real-life encounters with animals, the series follows the character of Mr Dog and his many sidekicks and friends. Between March 2019 and January 2020, four Mr Dog books were published, with two more billed for late 2020.

Fogle writes a weekly Country Diary for the Sunday Telegraph and is a regular columnist for The Daily Telegraph and travel writer for The Independent and has contributed to the Evening Standard, The New York Times, the Sunday Times and Glamour magazine. He has interviewed Gordon Brown and Prince William for the Mail on Sundays LIVE magazine. He is guest director of Cheltenham Literary Festival and a regular at the Hay-on-Wye festival.

Activism

Fogle is the UN Patron of the Wilderness, a role that sees him highlight the pressure and impact on the earth's wildest corners. His aim is to focus more attention on the conservation cause and inspire greater global action to ensure our actions do not damage the environment.

He is the President of the Campaign for National Parks. Fogle is also: an ambassador for the World Wildlife Fund (WWF) and Tusk; a supporter of the Duke of Edinburgh award scheme, and Hearing Dogs for Deaf People. He is a fellow of the Royal Geographical Society. He is also a patron for the British Hedgehog Preservation Society, the Prince's Trust, the Royal Parks Foundation, Child Bereavement UK and ShelterBox.

Alongside the historian Philippa Gregory, Fogle is a patron of the UK Chagos Supporters Association, fighting for the islanders' rights to return to the British Indian Ocean Territory. He has described "the story of the Chagos islanders' treatment at the hands of the UK government" as "one for which I am ashamed to be British [...] a story of deceit [... which has] shaken my very principles on conservation and democracy".

In August 2014, Fogle was one of 200 public figures who were signatories to a letter to The Guardian expressing their hope that Scotland would vote to remain part of the United Kingdom in September's referendum on that issue.

On 11 May 2020 Fogle announced that his Twitter account would henceforth be donated to a different charity on a rolling, weekly basis. The first charity selected was WECare, a UK and Sri Lankan registered veterinary charity. The repurposing of Fogle's Twitter account followed an incident of widespread trolling of Fogle following his suggestion of a nationwide sing-along to mark the 94th birthday of Queen Elizabeth II on Tuesday 21 April 2020.

Filmography
Television

Personal life
In 2006, Fogle married Marina Charlotte Elisabeth, daughter of Jonathan Hunt (son of John, Baron Hunt of Fawley) and Monika (daughter of Herbert Kuhlmann, of Schloss Urstein, Salzburg, Austria). Their first child, a boy named Ludovic Herbert Richard Fogle, was born in 2009. Their second child, a girl named Iona, was born in 2011. In 2014, they had a stillborn son, Willem; Marina also nearly died after suffering an acute placental abruption at 33 weeks.

While filming a series of Extreme Dreams in Peru in 2008, Fogle contracted leishmaniasis, which left him bedridden for three weeks on his return home. He was treated at London's Hospital for Tropical Diseases. Fogle went on to make a documentary, Make Me a New Face, about children suffering from flesh-eating bacteria called noma in Ethiopia. The documentary was broadcast on BBC Two.

Fogle was awarded an honorary doctorate of letters by the University of Portsmouth in 2007.

His waxwork was recently unveiled at Madame Tussauds. He was awarded the Freedom of the City of London in 2013.  Fogle has had an acting cameo on the television programme Hotel Babylon.

On 20 February 2013, BBC Newsbeat published an article stating that he had claimed that his drink had been spiked at a pub in Gloucestershire. He described the effects as making him try to jump out of a window, and he subsequently spent a night in hospital.

See also

 List of English writers
 List of television presenters
 Old Bryanstonians

References

External links

 benfogle.com, his official website
 Ben Fogle on Eden
 
 
 Atlantic Rowing Race

1973 births
Living people
20th-century English non-fiction writers
21st-century English memoirists
Alumni of the University of Portsmouth
British Jews
English people of Scottish descent
English people of Canadian descent
English television presenters
English travel writers
Fellows of the Royal Geographical Society
People educated at Bryanston School
People educated at The Hall School, Hampstead
University of Costa Rica alumni
British summiters of Mount Everest
Royal Naval Reserve personnel